Lycée-Collège Averroès is a private Muslim junior and senior high school/high school and sixth-form college in Lille, France. It contracted with the state and receives government subsidies, doing so since 2008;  it is the only Islamic secondary school in France to do so. The Lycée is located in  adjacent to a mosque.

History and mission
Opened in 2003, it is the first Muslim secondary school established in France. The school originally had 11 students.

The school was named after a 12th-century Andalusian-Arabian philosopher Ibn Rushd (also known as Averroes 1126-1198). The school's origins date back to 1994 when the Al-Imane Mosque began teaching 19 Muslim girls who were expelled from their public school for refusing to remove their headscarves. The school was officially established in 2003. It now has several hundred students and has been ranked as one of the top schools in the country.

The school aims to provide Muslim students with an alternative to the French public school education in the same way that French Catholics, Protestants and Jews do. In 2008, the school was granted the status of "sous contrat" meaning the French government pays teacher salaries and the school is required to follow the national curriculum.  It began receiving government subsidies in 2008.

 it had 340 students; the majority are low income and/or are of immigrant ancestry. Tuition differs depending on how much money a student's parents make, but it is about £1,000 British pounds annually.

By 2013 the school had a 100% pass rate in the French Baccalaureate. David Chazan of The Times wrote that this caused "soul-searching" in a country which emphasizes secular education.

Leadership
The first headmistress of the school was Sylvie Taleb who later resigned in 2006.

The school's current director is El Hassan Oufker. Its deputy director is Makhlouf Mameche, who also serves as the vice president of the Union of Islamic Organisations of France (UOIF), which has been criticized for its connections to the Muslim Brotherhood.

The president of the association that manages Averroes High School, Amar Lasfar is also the president of the Union of Islamic Organizations of France and the rector of the Lille-Sud mosque.

Funding
Before being granted the "sous contrat" status, the school relied on donations from the Muslim community of Nord-Pas-de-Calais.

The school relies upon large donations to expand its capabilities. While students do pay a small fee to attend the school, this is not enough to cover its expansion. The school's teachers are paid for by the state under the "sous contrat" designation.

Much of the school's funding comes from wealthy patrons such as Saudi Arabia and Qatar. The Saudi Development Bank paid 250,000 euros and Qatar Charity paid 800,000 euros for the school's most recent expansion.

Connections to the Muslim Brotherhood and UOIF
The opening of the school raised concern in secular France where even private religious schools are required to use the same core curriculum, can only teach religious subjects as electives, and where prayer must be optional. There was particular concern that the Al-Imane mosque is affiliated with the Union of Islamic Organizations in France, a powerful group that promotes a strict interpretation of Islam that includes grass-roots proselytizing, personal purification, and seeks to influence every aspect of a Muslim's life. The UOIF has been described as inseparable from the Muslim Brotherhood. In a report commissioned by the French government, the Muslim Brotherhood in Europe, as represented by the UOIF are the source of half of the institutional projects in France aiming to re-Islamize the younger generations and maintain their cultural specificity while creating a Muslim citizenship.

The school's leadership consists of the president and the vice president of the UOIF thus creating an inevitable tie between the ideologies of the UOIF and the school.

Controversies
In the wake of the 2015 Charlie Hebdo attacks, French citizens grew increasingly concerned about the risk of fundamentalism in their schools.  This, of course, turned an eye towards Averroes High School, as the only "sous contrat" Muslim school in France. An investigative story by France 2 found that the school regularly presented opportunities for open dialogue advocating freedom of expression and discussion of terrorism, particularly in the philosophy class of Soufiane Zitouni.

After the attack, Zitouni published an article called "Today, The Prophet is Also Charlie" which caused considerable backlash at the school. Zitouni says that he was warned by administrators that his article would cause him to gain enemies and that he should "look behind himself while walking in the street". Afterwards, another teacher who was close to Tariq and Hani Ramadan, the grandsons of Muslim Brotherhood founder Hassan al-Banna, published a replica article criticizing Zitouni's reasoning and stating that the attack on Charlie Hebdo was understandable under the premise that they espouse racist ideas. This led to a series of comments by students lauding the attacks against Charlie Hebdo. Zitouni says that the school turned a blind eye to these inflammatory comments.

Zitouni alleged that anti-Semitism was pervasive among the student body. He also claimed that students frequently criticized his "Islamic unorthodoxy" and questioned his legitimacy as a philosophy teacher. Zitouni also suspected that the school was part of Qatar's attempt to bring their strict Islam into French society.

In February 2015, Soufiane Zitouni resigned from his teaching position at the school saying that the school fostered extremism and was indoctrinating political Islam while still receiving government funding. Zitouni alleged that the school turned a blind eye when two of its students openly supported the Kouachi brothers, who carried out the Charlie Hebdo attack in January 2015. The school filed a defamation complaint against Zitouni.

There have been many questions about whether the school takes the UOIF's more fundamentalist view of the West's alleged debauchery and condemns things such as pre-marital sex or homosexuality, and how this may create a hostile environment towards Western activities.

Accusations have been made both by Zitouni and others that the school outwardly presents a moderate image that complies with the French requirements to receive funding while internally promoting radical views.

References

Further reading

External links
 Lycée-Collège Averroès 

Islamic schools in France
Averroes
2003 establishments in France
Educational institutions established in 2003
Lycées in Lille